Proline rich 13 is a protein that in humans is encoded by the PRR13 gene.

References

Further reading